Bedlam, a word for an environment of insanity, is a term that may refer to:

Places
 Bedlam, North Yorkshire, a village in England
 Bedlam, Shropshire, a small hamlet in England
 Bethlem Royal Hospital, a London psychiatric institution and the purported origin for the word for chaos or madness
 Bedlam Theatre, a student-run theatre in Edinburgh

Arts and media

Film and television
 Bedlam (1946 film), a thriller film starring Boris Karloff
 Bedlam (2019 film), a documentary film about mental health in the United States
 Bedlam (2011 TV series), a British supernatural drama
 Bedlam (2013 TV series), a documentary
 "Bedlam" (Pretty Little Liars), a 2016 episode of the TV series Pretty Little Liars

Literature
 Bedlam: London and Its Mad, a 2008 book on the history of mental illness in London
 "Tom o' Bedlam", an anonymous poem written circa 1600
 Bedlam (Kennen novel), a 2009 young adult book
 Bedlam, a 1992 science fiction novel by John Brosnan
 Bedlam (Brookmyre novel), 2013
 Bedlam, a novel in the Skulduggery Pleasant series by Derek Landy
 Tom o' Bedlam, the alias assumed by Edgar in the Shakespeare play King Lear
 Bedlam, a psychiatric hospital in the book Rebel Angels by Libba Bray
 The Bedlam, a mentally impaired character in the play The Roses of Eyam
 Bedlam (comics), a Marvel character

Music
 Bedlam, British 1970s rock band featuring Cozy Powell
 Bedlam, an early 1990s rock band fronted by Jay Joyce
 Bedlam, an American rap group formed in 1999 by Prozak
 Bedlam (EP), a 2006 EP by Twilightning
 Bedlam, a 2016 album by Michale Graves
 "Bedlam", a song by The Bel-Airs

Video games
 Bedlam (1982 video game), a game for the TRS-80
 Bedlam, a 1988 video game from Beam Software
 Bedlam (1996 video game), a 1996 video game from Mirage Technologies
 Bedlam (2015 video game), a game based on the novel
 Skyshine's Bedlam, a 2015 turn-based tactical roguelike game

Other media 
 UFC 85: Bedlam, a mixed martial arts pay-per-view event

Other
 Bedlam, a nickname for Institute F.C.'s YMCA Grounds (or Riverside Stadium) in Northern Ireland
 Bedlam cube, a puzzle invented by Bruce Bedlam
 Bedlam Series, a sports rivalry between the University of Oklahoma and Oklahoma State University